Anting is a maintenance behavior during which birds rub insects, usually ants, on their feathers and skin.  The bird may pick up the insects in its bill and rub them on the body (active anting), or the bird may lie in an area of high density of the insects and perform dust bathing-like movements (passive anting).  The insects secrete liquids containing chemicals such as formic acid, which can act as an insecticide, miticide, fungicide, or bactericide.  Alternatively, anting could make the insects edible by removing the distasteful acid, or, possibly supplement the bird's own preen oil. Instead of ants, birds can also use millipedes. More than 200 species of bird are known to ant. A possibly related behaviour, self-anointing, is seen in many mammals.

History

The first scientific writings of this behaviour dates back to 1831. American ornithologist John James Audubon described wild juvenile  turkeys that "wallowed" in abandoned ant hills. Another description was published by a naturalist in 1847 in a manuscript called "Bird of Jamaica". In it the author describes how ants remove parasites from a tame crow, while the crow is foraging for food. In 1934 an Alexander Hugh Chisholm described in Bird Wonders of Australia, a strange relationship birds had with ants. Erwin Stresemann in German as Einemsen then described this behaviour in the German ornithology journal Ornithologische Monatsberichte (Volume XLIII, p. 138) in 1935. Indian ornithologist Salim Ali interpreted an observation by his cousin Humayun Abdulali in the 1936 volume of Journal of the Bombay Natural History Society and included a reference to the Stresemann's paper suggesting that the German term could be translated into English as "anting".

Modes

Active  

Anting most commonly occurs on the ground but in some species, birds practice anting on tree branches. A bird will place the tip of its wing on the ground and rub its bill containing an ant from the tip of the wing up. The tail is usually tucked between the legs and under the body, which results in the bird being unstable. Birds use one ant at a time and only rub a feather once with an ant. However, there are some cases where an ant is used more than once but never exceeds three uses. There are some exceptions to this as starlings often take a ball of ants in their bills to be used for anting. Active anting happens very quickly and can often be mistaken for regular feather maintenance. This type of anting can last anywhere from just several minutes to half an hour. Most species of birds practice active anting and do this individually or in small groups. Birds may also use 'substitutes' in active anting. Birds have been seen to use snails, grasshoppers, amphipods and even larvae.

Passive 
Passive anting occurs when a bird rubs its wings and tail on an anthill. Once a bird has found an anthill it will then spread both of its wings forward at the same time. It will then sit on its tails which attracts the ants. Once the ants are on their wing feathers they provoke the ants by rubbing their head or beak through their feathers where the ants are. To prevent ants from crawling onto a bird's head or beak the bird will shake its head very quickly. The birds allow the ants to roam freely around its feathers. This type of anting is less common and is mostly seen in robins and ravens.

Functions

Ridding of ectoparasites 
Anting to get rid of ectoparasites is another hypothesis for anting in songbirds. This hypothesis suggests that birds use the chemical secretions that come from ants to control and rid of parasites in their feathers. Microorganisms such as bacteria and fungi can destroy a bird's feathers if their numbers get large enough. Formic acid is a commonly produced chemical by ants, and it was found to inhibit growth of feather destroying microorganisms. However, there is little evidence that chemicals from ants help to remove or deter other parasites such as feather lice and mites.

Feather grooming 

The hypothesis that anting is a form of feather maintenance suggests that anting brings saliva to the bird's feathers for use in preening. This helps to remove old preen oil and other substances.

Food preparation 
The food preparation hypothesis suggests that birds rub the ant in its feathers to remove a substance on the ant. Ants produce formic acid as an anti-predator adaptation. Thus, when an ant feels threatened, as when in the beak of a bird, it will spray formic acid. It is suggested that birds then rub the ants in their feathers to remove the harmful formic acid. The bird will then ingest the ant. This can be seen in European starlings, Sturnus vulgaris.

Sensory self-stimulation 
Anting has been compared to human activities such as smoking and other external stimuli that serve no biological purpose and is just for self-stimulation. This hypothesis has been suggested as anting has no obvious function, it is non-adaptive, birds are said to achieve pleasure from anting and anting has characteristics of a habit. However, there is no definitive evidence that sensory self-stimulation is the purpose of anting in birds. There have been several studies that claim to prove this hypothesis while others say just the opposite.

Functions in molt 
It has been found that passerine birds molt in the summer months. These birds often focus much of the anting on their wings and tails. This is where the largest feathers emerge, and it has been suggested that anting helps stimulate the growth of these feathers during molt. Not all birds that ant do so during molt.

Species of ants used 
Ants that spray and produce formic acid for defense are used for anting more often than species which do not spray or produce formic acid. Species from the subfamily Formicinae are the most commonly chosen by birds. Species from Dolichoderinae and Myrmicinae subfamilies are also used for anting however, not as common as Formicinae. If given a choice a bird will choose an ant in the subfamily Formicinae over all other species. In total there are 24 ant species birds use for anting.

Substitutes of ants 
Some birds participate in this anting behaviour but with other organisms and even objects. Some of the organisms birds use are garlic snails, amphipods, millipedes, dermapterans, caterpillars, grasshoppers, hemipterans, mealworm larvae, and wasps.

Related behaviours

Dusting with soil from ant-hills has been considered by some as equivalent to anting.

Some birds like antbirds and flickers not only ant, but also consume the ants as an important part of their diet. Other opportunist ant-eating birds include sparrows, wrens, grouse and starlings. European honey-buzzards have been found to gather fresh maple branches on the ground and then spread themselves over it and it has been suggested that this might be a case of tool-use to attract ants for anting.

Similar to anting may be the observed habit some birds show of picking up cigarette butts, sometimes lit, and rubbing themselves with them.

References

Bird behavior
Ethology